Kola Bernie Burger (born 5 May 1981) is a South African-born Namibian cricketer. He is a right-handed batsman and a left-arm medium-pace bowler.

He played with the Namibian cricket team during the 2005 ICC Trophy in Ireland in which they finished seventh. Generally speaking, Burger occupies the position of lower-middle-order batsman, contributing along with Ian van Zyl to a solid bowling attack.

In January 2008, Burger hit a career-best 74 in the ICC Inter-Continental Cup competition against the United Arab Emirates, and the following month, he hit his debut century, an innings of 100 in 57 balls, including seven fours and six sixes.

References

1981 births
White Namibian people
Afrikaner people
Namibian cricketers
Living people
Cricketers from Cape Town
South African emigrants to Namibia
Namibian people of South African descent